The first USS Scoter (SP-20), originally mistakenly designated both SP-20 and SP-53, was an armed motorboat that served in the United States Navy as a patrol vessel from 1917 until 1918 or 1919.

Scoter was built in 1916 by George Lawley & Son at Neponset, Massachusetts, as a private motorboat of the same name. She was enrolled in the Naval Coast Defense Reserve.

Her owner, J. L. Saltonstall of Boston, Massachusetts, delivered her to the U.S. Navy on 21 April 1917 for World War I service. She was commissioned as USS Scoter (SP-20) the same day. Originally, the Navy inadvertently gave her two designations, SP-20 and SP-53, but the designation SP-53 was later transferred to another patrol boat, USS Boy Scout (SP-53).

Assigned to duty with U.S. naval forces in Europe, Scoter was carried across the Atlantic Ocean on a larger ship. Records of her service after that are lacking; she probably operated in French waters into 1918. Unaccounted for, she was dropped from the Navy List in 1919; she probably was disposed of in Europe that year.

References

Department of the Navy: Naval Historical Center: Online Library of Selected Images: Civilian Ships: Scoter (American Motor Boat, 1916). Served as USS Scoter (SP-20) in 1917-1919.
NavSource Online: Section Patrol Craft Photo Archive Scoter (SP 20)

Patrol vessels of the United States Navy
World War I patrol vessels of the United States
Ships built in Boston
1916 ships